WXCH (102.9 FM) is a radio station licensed to Columbus, Indiana, United States.  The station airs a Classic hits format and is currently owned by Reising Radio Partners Inc.

References

External links
WXCH's website

XCH
Classic hits radio stations in the United States